Lasègue may refer to:

 Charles Lasègue (1816–1883), French physician
 Straight leg raise test, also called Lasègue test
 Christian Lasegue, American guitarist and keyboardist